Pirpainti Assembly constituency is one of 243 constituencies of the Bihar Legislative Assembly in India. It is part of the Bhagalpur Lok Sabha constituency along with other assembly constituencies viz Gopalpur, Bihpur, Kahalgaon, Bhagalpur and Nathnagar.

Overview
Pirpainti comprises CD Block Pirpainti; Gram Panchayats KAIRIA, Bansipur, Birbanna, Rampur,
Krisndaspur, Mohanpur Gogatta, Antichuck, Oriap, Mathurapur,
Ramjanipur, Ghogha, Ekdara, Lagma, Salempur Saini, Kurma,
Nandlalpur, Siya & Sadanandpur Baisa of Kahalgaon CD Block.

Members of Legislative Assembly

Election results

2020

2015

2010

References

External links
 

Politics of Bhagalpur district
Assembly constituencies of Bihar